"Lavender Haze" is a song by American singer-songwriter Taylor Swift from her tenth studio album, Midnights (2022). It was written by Swift, Jack Antonoff, Jahaan Sweet, Sounwave, Zoë Kravitz, and Sam Dew, and produced by the first four in addition to Braxton Cook. According to Swift, the title is a 1950s-dated common phrase referring to the state of being in love, inspired by the series Mad Men. The track was released to US radio on November 29, 2022, as the album's second single by Republic Records.

Musically, "Lavender Haze" hybridizes pop, ambient house, R&B, and disco music, with elements of electro hip hop; its production uses modular synthesizers, muffled synth drum beats, and layered, falsetto vocals in the refrain. The lyrics were inspired by the online and tabloid scrutiny surrounding the romantic relationship between Swift and English actor Joe Alwyn.

Upon the release of Midnights, "Lavender Haze" charted at number two in Australia, Canada, Ireland, New Zealand, the United States, and on the Billboard Global 200. Critics praised the song's sultry mood, danceability, and straightforward lyrics. The music video for "Lavender Haze", written and directed by Swift, was released on January 27, 2023. It incorporates psychedelic and surrealist elements, and features Dominican-American model Laith Ashley as Swift's love interest. The song was performed for the first time on the Eras Tour (2023).

Background and writing 
On August 28, 2022, Taylor Swift announced her tenth studio album, Midnights, set for release on October 21, 2022. The track-list was not immediately revealed. Jack Antonoff, a longtime collaborator of Swift who had worked with her since her fifth studio album 1989 (2014), was confirmed as a producer on Midnights by a video posted to Swift's Instagram account on September 16, 2022, titled "The making of Midnights". Beginning on September 21, 2022, Swift began unveiling the track-list in a randomized order through her short video series on TikTok, called Midnights Mayhem with Me. It consisted of 13 episodes, with one song revealed in every episode. Swift rolls a lottery cage containing 13 ping pong balls numbered from one to thirteen, each representing a track of Midnights, and when a ball drops out, she disclosed the title of the corresponding track on the album, through a telephone. In the ninth episode on October 7, 2022, Swift announced the title of the album's opening track as "Lavender Haze".

The singer revealed that she first stumbled upon the expression "lavender haze" when watching season 2, episode 12 of period drama series Mad Men. She then became intrigued by its meaning and found out about its origin in the 1950s. The singer subsequently saw parallels between the expression and her relationship with British actor Joe Alwyn. Swift explained that the song was specifically inspired by her relationship with Alwyn. To Swift, the title signified an "all-encompassing love glow". After revealing the song title as part of her TikTok series "Midnights Mayhem" on October 7, 2022, she went into further detail explaining the lyrics on her social media:

The song stood out when writing credits for the album were revealed on October 18, as it featured a more varied assembly of songwriters, including Zoë Kravitz, who had been friends with Swift for several years prior to the collaboration. Jazz musician Braxton Cook, who had been college roommates with Swift's collaborator Jahaan Sweet, provided a vocal sample that was ultimately used in the song. For his contribution, Cook received production credit. As an Easter egg for the then-still-unannounced song, Swift unveiled a "Lavender Edition" of Midnights upon release, exclusively available from Target.

Composition and lyrics 
"Lavender Haze" is a moody song rooted in ambient house, and pop genres such synth-pop and dream pop. Rob Sheffield from Rolling Stone described it as a 1990s R&B track, and Chris Willman from Variety described it as an "emo-erotic" song that leans towards modern R&B. Alex Blimes of Esquire dubbed it a "slow disco" song. It has a rhythmic-oriented, electro-hip-hop-inflected production with layered, falsetto vocals in the refrain, propelling modular synthesizers and synth drums. Ann Powers of NPR thought the song's layered vocals and synth drums are reminiscent of the music by Whitney Houston.

The lyrics are about the tabloid scrutiny and online rumors that Swift and Alwyn face, and wanting to stay away from it all with her lover. Neil McCormick of The Telegraph noted "the Prince-like falsetto funkiness" throughout the track, illustrated by "high-pitched backing vocals" from producer Jack Antonoff. Swift addresses engagement and marriage rumors with Alwyn, stressing how the concept has become outdated. She refers to questions surrounding the relationship as "dizzying" and compliments Alwyn's disregard to public inquiries about their relationship. Lyrically, the song was compared to "Delicate", "Dress" and "Call It What You Want", all from her album Reputation (2017).

Release 
Republic Records released Midnights on October 21, 2022 at 12:00 EDT, with "Lavender Haze" sequenced as the opening track. On November 29, 2022, the song was released to US contemporary hit radio as the album's second single. Following the premiere of the music video, "Lavender Haze" was made available for digital download in the US on Swift's official webstore.

A tropical house remix of "Lavender Haze" by German DJ Felix Jaehn was released on February 10, 2023. Three more remixes by Tensnake, Snakehips and Jungle, respectively, followed on March 3, 2023 and were released individually as digital downloads exclusively to Swift’s official webstore. All three, along with the remix by Felix Jaehn, were also released together that same day to streaming services in a remix EP.

Critical reception 
"Lavender Haze" received critical acclaim. Rolling Stones Brittany Spanos described the song as the most explicit on the album about Swift's "forcefield of protection", and compared it to "Cruel Summer" (2019) thematically, both being about "love glow breaking through all the negativity, criticism, and expectations." Sonically, Spanos praised the track's restrained, "subtle and shimmering sound" setting the mood for Midnights as the opening track. Chris Willmam of Variety opined that the song harkens Swift "back in autobiographical territory as a lyricist". Rick Quinn, writing for PopMatters, dubbed the song an "infectiously danceable tune". Paste critic Ellen Johnson said the song has a "sultry" melody with the lyrics expressing "feminist discontent". In congruence, Slate Carl Wilson wrote that "Lavender Haze" references the Madonna–whore complex. Billboard ranked "Lavender Haze" as the 69th best song of 2022.

Commercial performance 
"Lavender Haze" received over 16.4 million plays in its first 24 hours on Spotify globally, becoming the second biggest opening day for a song in the platform's history, behind the album's lead single "Anti-Hero".

In the United States, "Lavender Haze" debuted at number two on the Billboard Hot 100 (behind "Anti-Hero" at number one) with 41.4 million streams, 2,800 digital downloads sold, and 2.4 million airplay audience. With this, Swift earned the most number-two hits for a female artist in the chart's history. Swift became the first artist to simultaneously occupy the top-10 spots of the Hot 100; and the first act to occupy the entire top-10 of the Hot 100, Streaming Songs, and Digital Songs charts simultaneously. Midnights also became the first album in history to contain 10 top-10 songs. "Lavender Haze" spent a second consecutive week inside the top-10 of the Hot 100, alongside "Anti-Hero", "Bejeweled" and "Midnight Rain". After its release as the second single from Midnights, "Lavender Haze" charted at number six on the Pop Airplay and at number eight on the Adult Pop Airplay charts, becoming Swift's milestone twentieth top ten hit on the former and her twenty-seventh one on the latter.

Music video
The music video for "Lavender Haze" was teased along with the music videos for "Anti-Hero" and "Bejeweled" during the Midnights album trailer on Amazon Prime Video on October 20, 2022. It premiered on Swift's Vevo channel on YouTube at midnight EST on January 27, 2023.

Synopsis 

In the psychedelic video, Swift rises from her bed, where her lover, portrayed by Laith Ashley, lies asleep. A lavender-hued mist appears from underneath the bed and engulfs the room. The video cuts to Swift on a couch watching a weather channel on television, wearing a purple fur coat. She crawls towards the television through patches of lavender flowers and parts the screen like curtains, revealing koi fish swimming through an outer space featuring stars and bright purple clouds. In the next scene, Swift lies seemingly disrobed in a purple-hued pool. The video intercuts between Swift in the pool and in the lavender before cutting to her at a party with her lover, where they are dancing, engulfed in the lavender mist. The video ends with Swift back in her bedroom. The walls suddenly fall down, revealing the house to be afloat in space, and then leaving her on a cloud surrounded by the floating koi fish.

Analysis and interpretation 
 A vinyl record titled "Mastermind" is seen on the floor in the first scene of the video; the album artwork features the constellations of Sagittarius and Pisces, which are the zodiac signs of Swift and Alwyn, respectively.
 A lit incense stick is also seen in the first few shots, alluding to the lyrics of "Maroon", the second track of Midnights.
 The weather forecast news on TV displays a weather map of the eastern US, reporting rain at midnight in several locations—a reference to "Midnight Rain", the sixth track of Midnights.
 Ashley, who is Swift's love interest in the video, is also the weatherman on TV. This is considered a reference to a lyric in the bridge of "Karma", the 11th track of Midnights.
 Several fans and journalists identified the incorporation of koi fish as an easter egg of what is presumed to be Swift's next re-recorded album, Speak Now (Taylor's Version); the custom guitar Swift used to play songs acoustically at the Speak Now World Tour (2011–12) prominently featured three similar koi fish.
 The music video features a house floating in space surrounded by the koi fish, which has been compared to the fishbowl scene in the music video for Swift's 2019 single "Lover".

Track listing 
Digital download - Single
 "Lavender Haze" – 3:22

Digital download and streaming – Remixes
 "Lavender Haze" (Tensnake remix) – 3:34
 "Lavender Haze" (Snakehips remix) – 3:07
 "Lavender Haze" (Jungle remix) – 3:55
 "Lavender Haze" (Felix Jaehn remix) – 2:51
 "Lavender Haze" – 3:22

Credits and personnel 
Credits are adapted from the liner notes of Midnights.

Recording
 Recorded at Rough Customer Studio (Brooklyn), Electric Lady Studios (New York City), and Henson Recording Studio (Los Angeles)
 Mixed at MixStar Studios (Virginia Beach)
 Mastered at Sterling Sound (Edgewater, New Jersey)
 Jahaan Sweet's performance was recorded by himself at the Sweet Spot (Los Angeles)
 Dominik Rivinius's performance was recorded by Ken Lewis at Neon Wave Studio (Pirmasens, Germany)

Personnel
 Taylor Swift – vocals, songwriter, producer
 Jack Antonoff – songwriter, producer, engineer, drums, programming, percussion, synths, Juno 6, Mellotron, Wurlitzer, background vocals, recording
 Zoë Kravitz – songwriter, background vocals
 Sounwave – songwriter, producer, programming
 Jahaan Sweet – songwriter, producer, engineer, bass, bass pad, flute, Juno 6, recording
 Sam Dew – songwriter, background vocals, recording
 Braxton Cook – additional producer
 Dominik Rivinius – snare
 Laura Sisk – engineer, recording
 Ken Lewis – engineer, recording
 Megan Searl – assistant engineer
 Jon Sher – assistant engineer
 John Rooney – assistant engineer
 Mark Aguilar – assistant engineer
 Jonathan Garcia – assistant engineer
 Şerban Ghenea – mixing engineer
 Bryce Bordone – assistant mix engineer
 Randy Merrill – mastering engineer

Charts

Certifications

Release history

Footnotes

References 

2022 songs
2022 singles
Taylor Swift songs
Songs written by Taylor Swift
Songs written by Jack Antonoff
Songs written by Sounwave
Songs written by Sam Dew
Song recordings produced by Taylor Swift
Song recordings produced by Jack Antonoff
American synth-pop songs
American contemporary R&B songs
Songs with feminist themes
Transgender-related mass media
Dream pop songs
Psychedelic art